Eucalyptus socialis subsp. victoriensis, commonly known as the red mallee, is a subspecies of mallee that is endemic to southern inland Australia. It usually has rough bark on the base of the trunk, smooth bark above, lance-shaped adult leaves, flower buds in groups of between seven and eleven, pale creamy yellow flowers and barrel-shaped  to urn-shaped or spherical fruit.

Description
It usually has rough, loose, fibrous or flaky bark at the base of the trunk, smooth tan to grey bark above.

Taxonomy and naming
Eucalyptus socialis subsp. victoriensis was first formally described in 2005, by Dean Nicolle in Australian Systematic Botany from specimens collected near Neale Junction in 1999, close to the border between South Australia and Western Australia. The epithet victoriensis refers to this species' distribution in the Great Victoria Desert.

Distribution and habitat
This red mallee grows in mallee on sandplains and between sand dunes, often with other eucalypts, including E. concinna, E. eremicola and E. pimpiniana. It is restricted to the Great Victoria Desert in South Australia and Western Australia.

Conservation status
This mallee subspecies is classified as "not threatened" by the Western Australian Government Department of Parks and Wildlife.

References 

victoriensis
Myrtales of Australia
Flora of South Australia
Eucalypts of Western Australia
Plants described in 2005